Moradlu (also Romanized as Morādlū) is a village in Dikleh Rural District of the Central District of Hurand County, East Azerbaijan province, Iran. At the 2006 National Census, its population was 438 in 97 households, when it was in Hurand District of Ahar County. The following census in 2011 counted 456 people in 124 households. The latest census in 2016 showed a population of 512 people in 163 households; it was the largest village in its rural district.

References 

Populated places in East Azerbaijan Province